The Félegyhaza Tumbler is a breed of fancy pigeon developed over many years of selective breeding. Felegyhazer Tumblers, along with other varieties of domesticated pigeons, are all descendants of the rock dove (Columba livia). The name is short for Kiskunfélegyháza, a town in the Hungarian lowlands.

See also 

List of pigeon breeds

References

Pigeon breeds
Pigeon breeds originating in Hungary